Thomas Waters was a civil engineer and architect.

Thomas Waters may also refer to:

T. A. Waters (Thomas Alan Waters, 1938–1998), American magician and writer
Thomas Waters (MP) for King's Lynn (UK Parliament constituency)
Thomas Walters (South African politician) (born 1976)
'Thomas Waters' or just 'Waters' - a pseudonym of William Russell (fiction writer) (1806-1876), English crime story writer

See also
Thomas Walters (disambiguation)
Thomas Walter (disambiguation)